Pârâul Satului may refer to the following rivers in Romania:

 Pârâul Satului, a tributary of the Tăcășele in Arad County
 Pârâul Satului, a tributary of the Hăghig in Covasna County
 Pârâul Satului, a tributary of the Râul Negru in Covasna County